This page is a collection of VFL/AFL goalkicking records. The Australian Football League (AFL), known as the Victorian Football League (VFL) until 1990, is the elite national competition in men's Australian rules football. This list only includes home-and-away matches and finals; representative games (i.e. State of Origin or international rules), pre-season and Night Series games are excluded from the totals.

Most VFL/AFL goals
Below are the players who have kicked at least 500 goals at VFL/AFL level.

Updated to the end of round 1, 2023.

{| class="wikitable sortable" style=text-align:center
! class=unsortable style=width:2.5em | #
! Player
! Goals
! Club(s)
! Games
! 
! 
! Career span
! class=unsortable | 
|-
| rowspan=2 | 1 || rowspan=2 align=left |  || rowspan=2 | 1360 || align=left bgcolor=D9F9E9 |  (1983–1994; 898 goals, 183 games)‡ || rowspan=2 | 281 || rowspan=2 | 4.84 || rowspan=2 | 75.56 || rowspan=2 align=left | 1983–1999, 2002 || rowspan=2 | 
|-
| align=left |  (1995–1999, 2002; 462 goals, 98 games)
|-
| 2 || align=left |  || bgcolor=D9F9E9 | 1299‡ || align=left bgcolor=D9F9E9 | ‡ || 306 || 4.25 || 72.17 || align=left | 1920–1937 ||  
|-
| 3 || align=left |  || bgcolor=D9F9E9 | 1254‡ || align=left bgcolor=D9F9E9 | ‡ || 269 || 4.66 || 89.57 || align=left | 1985–1998 || 
|-
| rowspan=2 | 4 || rowspan=2 align=left |  || rowspan=2 | 1057 || align=left |  (1961–1972; 834 goals, 208 games) || rowspan=2 | 267 || rowspan=2 | 3.96 || rowspan=2 | 70.47 || rowspan=2 align=left | 1961–1975 || rowspan=2 | 
|-
| align=left |  (1973–1975; 223 goals, 59 games)
|- style=background:#E6E6FA
| rowspan=2 | 5 || rowspan=2 align=left |  || rowspan=2 | 1049 || align=left |  (2005–2013; 580 goals, 182 games) || rowspan=2 | 342 || rowspan=2 | 3.07 || rowspan=2 | 58.17 || rowspan=2 align=left | 2005–present || rowspan=2 | 
|- style=background:#E6E6FA
| align=left |  (2014–present; 469 goals, 160 games)
|-
| rowspan=2 | 6 || rowspan=2 align=left |  || rowspan=2 | 1031 || align=left |  (1982; 10 goals, 6 games) || rowspan=2 | 248 || rowspan=2 | 4.16 || rowspan=2 | 68.73 || rowspan=2 align=left | 1982, 1984–1997 || rowspan=2 | 
|-
| align=left bgcolor=D9F9E9 |  (1984–1997; 1021 goals, 242 games)‡
|-
| 7 || align=left |  || bgcolor=D9F9E9 | 970‡ || align=left bgcolor=D9F9E9 | ‡ || 294 || 3.30 || 53.89 || align=left | 1926–1943 || 
|-
| 8 || align=left |  || bgcolor=D9F9E9 | 926‡ || align=left bgcolor=D9F9E9 | ‡ || 270 || 3.43 || 61.73 || align=left | 1995–2009 || 
|-
| 9 || align=left |  || 915 || align=left |  || 332 || 2.76 || 53.82 || align=left | 1969–1985 || 
|-
| rowspan=2 | 10 || rowspan=2 align=left |  || rowspan=2 | 874 || align=left |  (1965–1975; 838 goals, 180 games) || rowspan=2 | 191 || rowspan=2 | 4.58 || rowspan=2 | 72.83 || rowspan=2 align=left | 1965–1975, 1977 || rowspan=2 | 
|-
| align=left |  (1977; 36 goals, 11 games)
|-
| rowspan=2 | 11 || rowspan=2 align=left |  || rowspan=2 | 817 || align=left |  (1969–1977; 241 goals, 177 games) || rowspan=2 | 366 || rowspan=2 | 2.23 || rowspan=2 | 45.39 || rowspan=2 align=left | 1969–1986 || rowspan=2 | 
|-
| align=left |  (1978–1986; 576 goals, 189 games)
|-
| 12 || align=left |  || 800 || align=left |  || 282 || 2.84 || 47.06 || align=left | 1993–2009 || 
|-
| 13 || align=left |  || 778 || align=left |  || 403 || 1.93 || 40.95 || align=left | 1965–1983 || 
|- style=background:#E6E6FA
| 14 || align=left |  || 756 || align=left |  || 327 || 2.31 || 47.19 || align=left | 2007–present || 
|-
| rowspan=2 | 15 || rowspan=2 align=left |  || rowspan=2 | 748 || align=left |  (1992–2000; 514 goals, 156 games) || rowspan=2 | 257 || rowspan=2 | 2.91 || rowspan=2 | 49.87 || rowspan=2 align=left | 1992–2006 || rowspan=2 | 
|-
| align=left |  (2001–2006; 234 goals, 101 games)
|-
| rowspan=3 | 16 || rowspan=3 align=left |  || rowspan=3 | 746 || align=left |  (1996–2001; 144 goals, 88 games) || rowspan=3 | 289 || rowspan=3 | 2.58 || rowspan=3 | 46.63 || rowspan=3 align=left | 1996–2011 || rowspan=3 | 
|-
| align=left |  (2002–2009; 467 goals, 162 games)
|-
| align=left |  (2010–2011; 135 goals, 39 games)
|-
| 17 || align=left |  || bgcolor=D9F9E9 | 738‡ || align=left bgcolor=D9F9E9 | ‡ || 251 || 2.94 || 61.50 || align=left | 1986–1997 || 
|-
| 18 || align=left |  || 735 || align=left |  || 195 || 3.77 || 56.54 || align=left | 1929–1941 || 
|- style=background:#E6E6FA
| 19 || align=left |  || 734 || align=left |  || 328 || 2.24 || 45.75 || align=left | 2007–present || 
|-
| rowspan=3 | 20 || align=left |  || 727 || align=left |  || 129 || 5.64 || 80.78 || align=left | 1967–1974, 1977 || 
|-
| rowspan=2 align=left |  || rowspan=2 | 727 || align=left bgcolor=D9F9E9 |  /  (1989–2001; 671 goals, 244 games)‡ || rowspan=2 | 272 || rowspan=2 | 2.67 || rowspan=2 | 48.47 || rowspan=2 align=left | 1989–2001, 2003–2004 || rowspan=2 | 
|-
| align=left |  (2003–2004; 46 goals, 28 games)
|-
| rowspan=2 | 22 || rowspan=2 align=left |  || rowspan=2 | 723 || align=left |  (2006–2007; 11 goals, 22 games) || rowspan=2 | 293 || rowspan=2 | 2.47 || rowspan=2 | 42.53 || rowspan=2 align=left | 2006–2022 || rowspan=2 | 
|-
| align=left bgcolor=D9F9E9 |  (2008–2022; 712 goals, 271 games)‡
|-
| 23 || align=left |  || 722 || align=left |  || 204 || 3.54 || 55.54 || align=left | 1926–1938 || 
|-
| 24 || align=left |  || 718 || align=left |  || 336 || 2.14 || 42.24 || align=left | 2001–2017 || 
|-
| 25 || align=left |  || 707 || align=left |  || 230 || 3.07 || 41.59 || align=left | 1906–1922 || 
|-
| 26 || align=left |  || bgcolor=D9F9E9 | 700‡ || align=left bgcolor=D9F9E9 | ‡ || 353 || 1.98 || 41.18 || align=left | 2000–2016 || 
|-
| 27 || align=left |  || bgcolor=D9F9E9 | 681‡ || align=left bgcolor=D9F9E9 | ‡ || 158 || 4.31 || 61.91 || align=left | 1930–1939, 1946 || 
|-
| rowspan=2 | 28 || rowspan=2 align=left |  || rowspan=2 | 662 || align=left |  (1922; 36 goals, 13 games) || rowspan=2 | 170 || rowspan=2 | 3.89 || rowspan=2 | 60.18 || rowspan=2 align=left | 1922, 1924–1933 || rowspan=2 | 
|-
| align=left bgcolor=D9F9E9 |  (1924–1933; 626 goals, 157 games)‡
|-
| rowspan=2 | 29 || rowspan=2 align=left |  || rowspan=2 | 640 || align=left |  (2005–2013, 2020–2021; 330 goals, 218 games) || rowspan=2 | 350 || rowspan=2 | 1.83 || rowspan=2 | 37.65 || rowspan=2 align=left | 2005–2021 || rowspan=2 | 
|-
| align=left |  (2014–2019; 310 goals, 132 games)
|-
| rowspan=3 | 30 || rowspan=3 align=left |  || rowspan=3 | 633 || align=left |  (1988–1993; 173 goals, 120 games) || rowspan=3 | 306 || rowspan=3 | 2.07 || rowspan=3 | 37.24 || rowspan=3 align=left | 1988–2004 || rowspan=3 | 
|-
| align=left |  (1994–1996; 89 goals, 32 games)
|-
| align=left |  (1997–2004; 371 goals, 154 games)
|-
| 31 || align=left |  || bgcolor=D9F9E9 | 631‡ || align=left bgcolor=D9F9E9 | ‡ || 306 || 2.06 || 39.44 || align=left | 1993–2008 || 
|-
| 32 || align=left |  || 629 || align=left |  || 224 || 2.81 || 48.38 || align=left | 1971–1983 || 
|-
| rowspan=2 | 33 || rowspan=2 align=left |  || rowspan=2 | 623 || align=left |  (1999–2009; 575 goals, 187 games) || rowspan=2 | 204 || rowspan=2 | 3.05 || rowspan=2 | 51.92 || rowspan=2 align=left | 1999–2010 || rowspan=2 | 
|-
| align=left |  (2010; 48 goals, 17 games)
|-
| 34 || align=left |  || 607 || align=left |  || 200 || 3.04 || 46.69 || align=left | 1977–1989 || 
|-
| rowspan=2 | 35 || align=left |  || 594 || align=left |  || 321 || 1.85 || 34.94 || align=left | 1986–2002 || 
|-
| align=left |  || bgcolor=D9F9E9 | 594‡ || align=left bgcolor=D9F9E9 | ‡ || 256 || 2.32 || 39.60 || align=left | 2000–2014 || 
|-
| rowspan=2 | 37 || rowspan=2 align=left |  || rowspan=2 | 593 || align=left |  (1974–1982; 494 goals, 143 games) || rowspan=2 | 177 || rowspan=2 | 3.35 || rowspan=2 | 49.42 || rowspan=2 align=left | 1974–1985 || rowspan=2 | 
|-
| align=left |  (1983–1985; 99 goals, 34 games)
|-
| rowspan=2 | 38 || rowspan=2 align=left |  || rowspan=2 | 588 || align=left |  (1992–1998; 440 goals, 118 games) || rowspan=2 | 165 || rowspan=2 | 3.56 || rowspan=2 | 58.80 || rowspan=2 align=left | 1992–2001 || rowspan=2 | 
|-
| align=left |  (1999–2001; 148 goals, 47 games)
|-
| 39 || align=left |  || 578 || align=left |  || 283 || 2.04 || 38.53 || align=left | 2005–2019 || 
|-
| rowspan=2 | 40 || align=left |  || 575 || align=left |  || 378 || 1.52 || 30.26 || align=left | 1974–1992 || 
|-
| align=left |  || bgcolor=D9F9E9 | 575‡ || align=left bgcolor=D9F9E9 | ‡ || 154 || 3.73 || 71.88 || align=left | 1982–1989 || 
|-
| rowspan=5 | 42 || rowspan=4 align=left |  || rowspan=4 | 574 || align=left |  (1982–1992; 411 goals, 187 games) || rowspan=4 | 283 || rowspan=4 | 2.03 || rowspan=4 | 33.76 || rowspan=4 align=left | 1982–1998 || rowspan=4 | 
|-
| align=left |  (1993; 39 goals, 16 games)
|-
| align=left |  (1994–1996; 98 goals, 51 games)
|-
| align=left |  (1997–1998; 26 goals, 29 games)
|- 
| align=left |  || 574 || align=left |  || 275 || 2.09 || 44.15 || align=left | 2001–2013 || 
|-
| rowspan=2 | 44 || rowspan=2 align=left |  || rowspan=2 | 572 || align=left |  (1935–1948; 546 goals, 210 games) || rowspan=2 | 227 || rowspan=2 | 2.52 || rowspan=2 | 35.75 || rowspan=2 align=left | 1935–1950 || rowspan=2 | 
|-
| align=left |  (1949–1950; 26 goals, 17 games)
|-
| rowspan=2 | 45 || rowspan=2 align=left |  || rowspan=2 | 561 || align=left |  (1983–1995, 2002; 520 goals, 224 games) || rowspan=2 | 324 || rowspan=2 | 1.73 || rowspan=2 | 29.53 || rowspan=2 align=left | 1983–2000, 2002 || rowspan=2 | 
|-
| align=left |  (1996–2000; 41 goals, 100 games)
|-
| 46 || align=left |  || 558 || align=left |  /  || 364 || 1.53 || 32.82 || align=left | 1994–2010 || 
|-
| 47 || align=left |  || 554 || align=left |  /  || 341 || 1.62 || 30.78 || align=left | 1990–2007 || 
|-
| rowspan=4 | 48 || align=left |  || 549 || align=left |  || 250 || 2.20 || 36.60 || align=left | 1979–1993 || 
|-
| rowspan=2 align=left |  || rowspan=2 | 549 || align=left |  (1995–2000; 159 goals, 115 games) || rowspan=2 | 260 || rowspan=2 | 2.11 || rowspan=2 | 39.21 || rowspan=2 align=left | 1995–2008 || rowspan=2 | 
|-
| align=left |  (2001–2008; 390 goals, 145 games)
|-
| align=left |  || bgcolor=D9F9E9 | 549‡ || align=left bgcolor=D9F9E9 | ‡ || 255 || 2.15 || 39.21 || align=left | 1997–2010 || 
|-
| 51 || align=left |  || 548 || align=left |  || 196 || 2.80 || 49.82 || align=left | 1934–1944 || 
|-
| rowspan=2 | 52 || rowspan=2 align=left |  || rowspan=2 | 540 || align=left |  (1941, 1944–1950; 429 goals, 117 games) || rowspan=2 | 142 || rowspan=2 | 3.80 || rowspan=2 | 54.00 || rowspan=2 align=left | 1941–1950 || rowspan=2 | 
|-
| align=left |  (1942–1943; 111 goals, 25 games)
|-
| rowspan=2 | 53 || align=left |  || 537 || align=left |  || 98 || 5.48 || 89.50 || align=left | 1949–1954 || 
|- style=background:#E6E6FA
| align=left |  || bgcolor=D9F9E9 | 537‡ || align=left bgcolor=D9F9E9 | ‡ || 239 || 2.25 || 35.73 || align=left | 2008–present || 
|- style=background:#E6E6FA
| rowspan=2 | 55 || rowspan=2 align=left |  || rowspan=2 | 533 || align=left bgcolor=D9F9E9 |  (2012–2020; 427 goals, 171 games)‡ || rowspan=2 | 211 || rowspan=2 | 2.53 || rowspan=2 | 48.27 || rowspan=2 align=left | 2012–present || rowspan=2 | 
|- style=background:#E6E6FA
| align=left |  (2021–present; 106 goals, 40 games)'|-
| rowspan=2 | 56 || rowspan=2 align=left |  || rowspan=2 | 527 || align=left |  (1980–1984; 156 goals, 43 games) || rowspan=2 | 140 || rowspan=2 | 3.76 || rowspan=2 | 47.91 || rowspan=2 align=left | 1980–1990 || rowspan=2 | 
|-
| align=left |  (1985–1990; 371 goals, 97 games)
|-
| rowspan=3 | 57 || rowspan=3 align=left |  || rowspan=3 | 524 || align=left |  (1996; 0 goals, 3 games) || rowspan=3 | 231 || rowspan=3 | 2.27 || rowspan=3 | 34.93 || rowspan=3 align=left | 1996–2010 || rowspan=3 | 
|-
| align=left |  (1997–2009; 496 goals, 219 games)
|-
| align=left |  (2010; 28 goals, 9 games)
|-
| 58 || align=left |  || 521 || align=left |  || 303 || 1.72 || 34.73 || align=left | 1995–2009 || 
|-
| 59 || align=left |  || 518 || align=left |  /  || 432 || 1.20 || 20.57 || align=left | 1996–2016 || 
|-
| rowspan=2 | 60 || rowspan=2 align=left |  || rowspan=2 | 516 || align=left |  (2002–2015; 452 goals, 253 games) || rowspan=2 | 293 || rowspan=2 | 1.75 || rowspan=2 | 32.25 || rowspan=2 align=left | 2002–2017 || rowspan=2 | 
|-
| align=left |  (2016–2017; 64 goals, 40 games)
|-
| 61 || align=left |  || 514 || align=left |  || 150 || 3.43 || 57.11 || align=left | 1989–1997 || 
|-
| 62 || align=left |  || 511 || align=left |  /  || 200 || 2.56 || 42.58 || align=left | 1988–1999 || 
|}

Club goalkicking record holders
Below are the players who hold the record for most goals kicked at their respective clubs.Updated to the end of round 1, 2023''.

VFL/AFL goalkicking record holder
Below are the players who have held the record for the most goals kicked at VFL/AFL level, beginning with the first player to reach 100 goals.

See also
 VFL/AFL games records
 AFL Women's goalkicking records

References

Sources
 Most career goals at AFL Tables
 Every AFL goalkicker at Australian Football

500 goals
500 goals
500 goals